The Lancia Tipo 4 was an Italian aircraft engine constructed by Lancia in the mid-1910s.

History 
This water-cooled V-12 aircraft engine was built in 1916 and had a 50-degree angle between the cylinder banks. The Tipo 4 had a  bore and a  stroke. The engine shipped to the United States in late 1917.

Applications
Caproni Ca.37
Caproni Ca.38

Specifications

See also

References 

Lancia Michael Frostick Published by Dalton Watson Ltd., London (1976)

Lancia aircraft engines
1910s aircraft piston engines